The 1991 Football Championship of the Belarusian SSR was the 55th and last regular annual competition in football of the Byelorussian Soviet Socialist Republic at all-republican level. In the competition took part 44 teams in two tiers.

With the ongoing process of disintegration of the Soviet Union during 1991, upon conclusion of the season nine better clubs and six Soviet teams of masters from Belarus formed the First League (Top League) of independent Belarus.

Overview
The championship consisted of three tiers: First (Pershaja), Second (Druhaja) leagues and Trade Union competitions. Six teams were participating in the All-Union competitions and represented all the regional centers of Belarusian SSR: Dynama Mensk, Dynama Brest, Dnepr Mahiljow, KIM Vitsebsk, Njoman Hrodna, Homselmash Homiel.

The First League was contested by 15 teams, and Metalurh Maladzechna won the championship.

Pershaja Liha

Teams

Final standings

Druhaja Liha final standings

Subgroup 1

Subgroup 2

References
 RSSSF
 history of the USSR championships among KFK (tables) (История первенств CCCР среди КФК  (таблицы)). regional-football.ru

Football Championship of the Belarusian SSR
Football
Belarus